The River Seph (or River Sep) is a tributary of the River Rye (itself a tributary of the River Derwent) in North Yorkshire, England. The river flows for  down Bilsdale and meets the Rye near the village of Hawnby. The name derives from Old Swedish and means either Slow Stream or Calm. When the surrounding land was owned by Roger de Mowbray, the river was referred to as the Sep.

Course
The river starts in Bilsdale at the village of Chop Gate where the waters of the Bilsdale and Raisdale Becks meet, though some of the sources start on Urra Moor. Historically, parts of the river were the delineating boundaries between ancient parishes.

Bilsdale is narrow and densely wooded at the head of the valley, but further down becomes wider and the water meanders before it joins the Rye.

Natural History
The river has suffered with invasive species such as Himalayan balsam and Japanese Knotweed which have been the subject of various programmes to eradicate them. The river has also benefitted from a government grant to help fish navigation and a reduction in pollution.

It was known to be a good trout stream in the late 19th/early 20th centuries, and various agencies came together in 2015 to improve fish passages on the watercourse to allow the migration of trout from the River Rye.

The river flows across the south western edge of the North York Moors and as such has limestone, gritstone, mudstone and siltstone as its bedrock. During dry summers, the waters disappear into the bedrock and the river becomes totally subterranean. The sides of Bilsdale where the Seph meanders, are lined with ancient Oak trees and the North York Moors National Park Authority were granted Heritage Lottery Funding in 2017 to protect the land and study the wildlife along the upper reaches of the River Rye. This will include the Seph and will look at some of the native species which make use of the watercourse such as the alcathoe bat and the white-clawed crayfish.

Settlements
Bilsdale is a remote valley populated mainly with hamlets as opposed to villages and towns. From the source of the Seph downstream, these are;
Seave Green
Chop Gate
Cross Holme
Fangdale Beck

References

External links

Seph
Ouse catchment